The Emperor William Tower or Kaiser Wilhelm Tower is an observation tower near Holzminden in the German state of Lower Saxony, built in honour of the German emperor, William I. It was erected in 1908 and is 17 metres high.

Location 
The tower stands in the borough of Holzminden on the western slopes of the Sylbecker Berg south of the town. It is located on the southern edge of the municipal park at a height of about 170 m. About 400 metres to the west is a section of the road from Holzminden to Lüchtringen, the Landesstraße 550.

History and description 
The tower, built in 1908 of Weser sandstone to a square plan, has a viewing platform above the tower room. The western side of the platform has a round, decorative turret.

From the platform are views of the River Weser and the Solling hills.

References 

1900s architecture
Stone buildings
Holzminden
Observation towers in Lower Saxony
Holzminden (district)